Khor is an ancient region located in the south of ancient Syria, probably around modern Lebanon. It has long been an outpost of ancient Egypt.

Geography of ancient Egypt
Ancient Lebanon